This is a list of playwrights either born in Scotland or living/based in Scotland. Playwrights whose work is in Scottish Gaelic and Broad Scots are included.

A – J

K – Z

See also
Theatre of Scotland
List of theatres in Scotland
List of Irish dramatists
Scottish literature
List of Scottish poets
List of Scottish novelists
List of Scottish short story writers

Scottish dramatists
Dramatists
Scottish
 
Scottish drama
Theatre in Scotland
Dramatists